Populism in Canada involves the phenomenon of populist political ideology in Canada. Populism has been a particularly strong phenomenon in Western Canada and in Quebec as promoted by the provincial Social Credit parties in the West and in Quebec and by the Social Credit Party of Canada and by the Reform Party of Canada.

According to Laycock, Quebecois populism is largely intertwined in Quebec nationalism and thus has to be examined with its own ideological and linguistic dynamics taken into consideration.

Overview
In his 1981 Studies in Political Economy journal article, "Populism: A qualified defence", John Richards, a public policy professor at Simon Fraser University, said that there were elements of populism in the Liberal Party under Mackenzie (leader from 1873 to 1880) and Laurier (leader from 1887 to 1919); Pattulo's British Columbia Liberal Party during the 1930s; Liberal Party of Ontario under Mitchell Hepburn (leader from  1930 to 1942); the many socialist and labour parties leading up to the 1932 founding of the CCF; the Manitoba Liberal-Progressive Party; the Union Nationale in Quebec under Maurice Duplessis  (leader from 1935 to 1959); the early Diefenbaker Tory party; the federal NDP under Tommy Douglas (leader from 1961 to 1971); and, to some extent, the Liberal Party of P. E. Trudeau (leader from 1968 to 1984). Richards identified four "types of populist experience"agrarian
protest populist movements in the United States and Canada; the 19th century traditional, communal values, peasant populism admired by Russian intellectuals; authoritarian populism of regimes such Peronism in Argentina; and contemporary populism adopted by political leaders and parties to appeal to the "shared interests of the people" in contrast to those of the "powerfully organized 'vested interests' and traditional 'old-line' politicians." Richards traced a shift in the populist movement to the mid-1980s. He said that left-wing activists in North America shifted away from New Left politics in the 1970s. In Canada, some became active in unions, the New Democrat Party, and the Parti Québécois. The 1986 book Citizen Action said that in the 1960s and 1970s in the United States, American conservatism became "imbued with right-wing populism".

19th century 
Anti-establishment populist politics became an important political force in 19th century Ontario amongst rural and working class political activists who were influenced by American populist radicals. Populism also became an important political force in Western Canada by the 1880s and 1890s. Populism was particularly strong in the form of farmer-labour coalition politics in the late 19th century.

20th century 
Multiple important populist political movements were formed throughout Canada in the 20th century. Western Canada and the Canadian Prairies in particular were the source of origin of a number of Canada's populist movements in the 20th century.

United Farmers movement
In 1921, both Liberals and Conservatives lost to the United Farmers of Alberta (UFA) in the 1921 provincial election. The United Farmers of Alberta (UFA) and United Farmers of Saskatchewan (UFS) were formed by Prairie farmers that rejected party-dominated parliamentary representation advocated a quasi-syndicalist system of functional representation in a delegate democracy. The UFA governed the province of Alberta from 1921 to 1935.

Social Credit (Socred)
The Social Credit populist political parties won provincial elections in three provincesthe 1935 Alberta general election under William AberhartBible Billthe 1952 British Columbia general election under W.A.C. Bennett , and in Québec in the 1961 election under Réal Caouette, who later formed his own party, the Creditistes. At the federal level both the Socred and Creditistes were represented in Parliament until 1980.

In 1933, William Aberhart, also known as Bible Bill, formed the Social Credit Party of Alberta (Socred). The socred governed the province continuously from 1935 until the 1971 election, when the party lost to Peter Lougheed's Progressive Conservatives. The Social Credit Party of Alberta led by William Aberhart promoted the principles of social credit economics alongside a right-wing populist agenda and the party governed Alberta from 1935 to 1971. By the late 1930s with social credit financial reforms being unable to be carried out at the provincial level, Aberhart refocused the Alberta Social Credit party to attacking social welfare programs and state socialism. Ernest Manning took over the Alberta Social Credit party and office of Premier of Alberta from Aberhart and led the Alberta Social Credit party along a right-wing populist agenda that criticized both the social welfare programs and centralizing tendencies of the federal government of Canada.

Co-operative Commonwealth Federation (CCF)
In 1932, in response to the hardships of the Great Depression, a coalition of labour, socialists, and progressives in Calgary, Alberta founded the Co-operative Commonwealth Federation (CCF). Tommy Douglas, who became a social activist at the onset of the Depression, joined the new CCF and was elected as MP in the 1935 federal election.

In his 1978 Canadian Journal of Political Science journal article, "Populism in the United States, Russia, and Canada: Explaining the Roots of Canada's Third Parties", John Conway said that CCF and Alberta's Social Credit were, to some extent, "populist formations." Conway said that the CCF is an example of a populist party that transitioned successfully into a democratic partythe New Democratic Party. He said that the NDP, which was formed in 1961, was modelled on European social democratic parties and Britain's and Australia's Labour parties.

Reform Party of Canada
The Reform Party of Canada was a right-wing populist party that existed from 1987 to 2000. It was formed and led by Preston Manning, the son of former Social Credit Alberta Premier Ernest Manning. It was originally a Western Canadian protest party that captured the support of right-wing Western Canadians who were disillusioned with the federal Progressive Conservative Party of Canada and in particular its preference for resolving the grievances of Quebec over the West. It also drew support of right-wing conservative Canadians who were dismayed by the Progressive Conservatives' inability to deliver their promised tax cuts and spending cuts. In 1993, the Reform Party made a political breakthrough in electing large numbers of members of parliament.

21st century 

The People's Party of Canada has self-described as populist, and been described as populist by many journalists. Its leader, Maxime Bernier, refers to it as "smart populism", which is based on principles of freedom, responsibility, fairness, and respect, that speak for "all Canadians" and which do not appease special interest groups.

Pierre Poilievre, who has been described as populist by some journalists, won the 2022 Conservative Party of Canada leadership election and became the leader of both the Conservative Party and the Official Opposition. Some journalists have compared Poilievre to American Republican populists such as Ted Cruz, while many journalists have dismissed these comparisons due to Poilievre's pro-choice, pro-immigration, and pro-same-sex-marriage positions.

Citations

References

 
 
 
 
 
 
 
 
 
 * 
 

Political movements in Canada
Populism